CAREM is a small modular reactor for electrical power generation currently under construction near the city of Zárate, in the northern part of Buenos Aires province beside the Atucha I Nuclear Power Plant.

Design
The reactor was integrally designed by CNEA (National Atomic Energy Commission), being the first power reactor designed by the country. It is basically a simplified pressurized water reactor (PWR) designed to have an electrical output of 25MW for the first prototype, 100MW in the following one. It is an integral reactor – the coolant system is inside the reactor vessel – so that the entire plant operates at the same pressure. This design minimizes the risk of loss-of-coolant accidents (LOCA). Its fuel is uranium oxide with a  enrichment of 3.4% that needs to be replaced annually. The primary coolant system uses natural circulation, so there are no pumps required, which provides inherent safety against core meltdown, even in accident situations.

History 
In 1984 it was presented publicly for the first time during an IAEA conference in Peru. For political reasons the project was halted but was relaunched by the 2006 Argentine nuclear reactivation plan.

The 25 MWe prototype version of CAREM currently being built will be followed by a second one of 100–200 MWe to be installed in Formosa Province. 

As of 2013, the first prototype was planned to receive its first fuel load in 2017. First concrete was poured in February 2014.

As of 2016, the completion of the project was scheduled for the end of 2018. Cost has been estimated to US$446-700 million. As of 2018, the start date was deferred to 2020.

In November 2019, construction was halted due to late payments to the contractor, design changes and late delivery of technical documentation. A new contract for finishing the concrete structures of the reactor was awarded in November 2021.

See also
 List of small modular reactor designs

References

External links 
  

Nuclear reactors
Nuclear technology in Argentina

Small modular reactor